Lovoa trichilioides, also called African walnut, Congowood, dibetou or tigerwood, is a species of plant in the family Meliaceae. It is found in Angola, Cameroon, the Republic of the Congo, the Democratic Republic of the Congo, Ivory Coast, Gabon, Ghana, Liberia, Nigeria, Sierra Leone, Tanzania, and Uganda. It is threatened by habitat loss. Germination success is somewhat limited by short-lived seeds which are heavily predated. Exploitation rates are high. It is one of the two principal timber species in Congo.

References

trichilioides
Vulnerable plants
Taxonomy articles created by Polbot

ru:Ловоа